Sandford Hydro is a small hydroelectric scheme located on the River Thames in Oxfordshire, England. It uses the head of water provided by the weir at Sandford Lock in Sandford-on-Thames, but is actually situated on the opposite bank of the river in Kennington. It can generate  of electricity with its three archimedes screw turbines. Construction began in 2011, and the plant became operational in 2018.

Sandford Hydro is owned by Low Carbon Hub Sandford Hydro Ltd, which is itself a subsidiary Low Carbon Hub IPS Ltd, an industrial and provident society for the benefit of the community that seeks to develop a decentralised, locally-owned renewable energy infrastructure for Oxfordshire.

As part of the development of the hydro scheme, a new fish pass has been constructed. It is designed to help fish adapted to both fast and slow watercourses, and comprises a  gravel-lined channel with a gradient of 1 in 160, flanked at either end by sections with a gradient of 1 in 20 and brush and baffle components.

Gallery

References 

Buildings and structures in Oxfordshire
Hydroelectric power stations in England
Power stations in South East England